Joshua Alexander Caldwell (born December 5, 1983) is an American film director, screenwriter, and producer. In 2006, he won a Golden Popcorn award at the MTV Movie Awards for writing, directing and producing the film The Beautiful Lie.

Biography 

Joshua Caldwell was born in Seattle, Washington, on December 5, 1983, to Barry and Debra Caldwell. Barry is a salesman for the Boeing Company and Debra is a homemaker. He has one sibling, a younger brother named Luke. 

Beginning with screenwriting, he then moved into film production in at Bellevue High School, where he created several different award-winning film projects. He attended Fordham University in New York City where he went on to write, produce and direct eight films, including The Beautiful Lie, starring Michaela McManus, which has been featured at several film festivals across the country. In June 2006, Caldwell was awarded an MTV Movie Award for the Best Film On Campus category. In 2007, he produced and directed The Ronnie Day Project for SonyBMG/Epic Records and mtvU.

In 2010, Caldwell co-wrote, directed and produced the short film Dig. Premiering at film festivals in 2011 and 2012, the film is the story of a young Holocaust survivor who, twenty years after his exodus from Europe, comes face to face with the Nazi responsible for his family's death. The film stars Mark Margolis and Aaron Himelstein.

Following the premiere of "Dig" at the 2011 LAShortsFest, Caldwell co-wrote, directed, produced and edited the cyber-bridges for the third book in Anthony E. Zuiker's (creator of CSI:) digi-novel trilogy Level 26: Dark Revelations. The book was released nationwide on December 29, 2011, with the cyber-bridge (video components) being made available at Level26.com the same day.

In 2012, Caldwell began developing a feature film with Participant Media, on which he serves as a co-writer. He co-produced the online digital feature "Cybergeddon" from Anthony E. Zuiker and directed, produced, and co-wrote the Cybergeddon Zips, an eight-part series of short films that extend the characters and narrative from the feature experience.

Caldwell was a producer on the BlackBoxTV series Anthony E. Zuiker Presents, overseeing the production of short films for the YouTube Channel. Two of the films, The Reawakening, directed by two-time Academy Award winner Rob Legato, and Execution Style, directed by Lexi Alexander, have been released.

In 2013, Caldwell wrote and directed his debut feature film, Layover. Made for $6,000, the film was shot on a Canon 5D and stars Nathalie Fay, Karl E. Landler, Bella Dayne and Hal Ozsan. The film is almost entirely French language although Caldwell does not speak French.

Layover had its world premiere at the 2014 Seattle International Film Festival on May 30, 2014 to a sell out crowd. The film was one of twelve features nominated for the festival's New American Cinema award. On June 4, 2014, the film had its California premiere at the Dances With Films festival in L.A. The film has received a warm reception and much of its notice is due to the small budget used to produce it. Websites like NoFilmSchool and Slashfilm have featured the film as an example of excellent filmmaking on a minuscule budget.

Layover is the first film in a planned three-part series called the LAX trilogy. Centered around characters who pass through Los Angeles International Airport, the films themselves are all very different, in terms of tone and genre. The second film, Assassin and the third film, Ten, are scheduled to be shot in winter 2016.

Caldwell directed the entire first season of the new Hulu show South Beach. Starring Jacqueline M Wood, Manny Montana, Jordi Vilasuso and Ana Vilafane the six-episode series, set in the affluent Miami neighborhood, follows the aftermath of a murder that appears to signal the return of a serial killer thought to have been killed two decades earlier. As the investigation proceeds, a complex web of crime, greed and betrayal ties together rival drug lords, bitter conflicts within the music industry, local politics and law enforcement.

In 2016, Caldwell directed his second feature Be Somebody starring social media star Matthew Espinosa and Sarah Jeffrey. The film was produced by Studio 71 and released in theaters and on Digital HD by Paramount Pictures.

In 2017, Caldwell's third feature film Negative was released. The film stars Katia Winter, Simon Quarterman and Sebastian Roche. Set in the American southwest the film follows Natalie, a former British spy who flees Los Angeles for Phoenix after a deal with a cartel goes wrong. She's joined by Hollis, a street photographer who has put his life at risk by taking Natalie's photo at the wrong time and in the wrong place. The film was released by MarVista Entertainment.

In 2019, Caldwell wrote and directed the heist thriller film Infamous starring Bella Thorne and Jake Manley. The film was released on June 12, 2020.

Awards and honors 
Caldwell has received numerous awards for his work. In 2001, his film American Tragedy won the Award of Excellence at the 2001 Crystal Awards, the Award of Excellence at the 2001 Videographer Awards, and honorable mention in the 2001 Columbus International Film Festival (where he competed among college students) and was an honorable mention in the 2001 Seattle Times Short Film Festival.

The Family Will was an official selection at the 11th Annual Urbanworld VIBE Film Festival and the 2008 Pan-African Film Festival.

In addition to winning the MTV Movie Award for Best Film on Campus in 2006, The Beautiful Lie, was also an official selection at the Los Angeles International Short Film Festival, the One Reel Film Festival and the Seattle True Independent Film Festival (where it won the Classic Beauty Prize). It won the Award of Distinction at the 2006 Videographer Awards, was an honorable mention at the 2006 Columbus International Film Festival and won the Grand Prize and Audience Award at the Fordham C.I.T.Y. Student Film Festival.

Dig has been an official selection of the 2011 LAShortsFest, Carmel Art & Film Festival, NewFilmmakersLA, the 2012 Durango Independent Film Festival, Beverly Hills Film Festival, Los Angeles Jewish Film Festival, Dances With Films Festival, HollyShorts Film Festival, Action On Film International Film Festival and Nevada Film Festival, where it won the Silver Screen Award for Short Film.

Resignation was an Official Selection of the 2014 Hollyshorts Film Festival and was featured during a panel discussion with Caldwell and producer Alex LeMay at the 2014 San Diego Comic-Con.

Layover was an Official Selection of, and had its World Premiere at the 2014 Seattle International Film Festival. Caldwell and the film were nominated for the festival's prestigious New American Cinema Award. It was also an Official Selection of the 2014 Dances With Films Festival where it also screened in competition.

Select filmography

References

External links 
 
 Meydenbauer Entertainment
 Hollywood Bound and Down blog
 Best Film On Campus Profile
 "The Ronnie Day Project" at mtvU

Living people
1983 births
Filmmakers from Seattle
Fordham University alumni
Film directors from Washington (state)